Detached objects are a dynamical class of minor planets in the outer reaches of the Solar System and belong to the broader family of trans-Neptunian objects (TNOs). These objects have orbits whose points of closest approach to the Sun (perihelion) are sufficiently distant from the gravitational influence of Neptune that they are only moderately affected by Neptune and the other known planets: This makes them appear to be "detached" from the rest of the Solar System, except for their attraction to the Sun.

In this way, detached objects differ substantially from most other known TNOs, which form a loosely defined set of populations that have been perturbed to varying degrees onto their current orbit by gravitational encounters with the giant planets, predominantly Neptune. Detached objects have larger perihelia than these other TNO populations, including the objects in orbital resonance with Neptune, such as Pluto, the classical Kuiper belt objects in non-resonant orbits such as Makemake, and the scattered disk objects like Eris.

Detached objects have also been referred to in the scientific literature as extended scattered disc objects (E-SDO), distant detached objects (DDO), or scattered–extended, as in the formal classification by the Deep Ecliptic Survey. This reflects the dynamical gradation that can exist between the orbital parameters of the scattered disk and the detached population.

At least nine such bodies have been securely identified, of which the largest, most distant, and best known is Sedna. Those with perihelia far beyond the Kuiper cliff are termed sednoids. As of 2023, there are four known sednoids: Sedna, 2012 VP113, Leleākūhonua, and 2021 RR205. These objects exhibit a highly statistically significant asymmetry between the distributions of object pairs with small ascending and descending nodal distances that might be indicative of a response to external perturbations; asymmetries such as this one are sometimes attributed to perturbations induced by unseen planets.

Orbits 

Detached objects have perihelia much larger than Neptune's aphelion. They often have highly elliptical, very large orbits with semi-major axes of up to a few hundred astronomical units (AU, the radius of Earth's orbit). Such orbits cannot have been created by gravitational scattering by the giant planets, not even Neptune. Instead, a number of explanations have been put forward, including an encounter with a passing star or a distant planet-sized object, or Neptune itself (which may once have had a much more eccentric orbit, from which it could have tugged the objects to their current orbit) 
or ejected planets (present in the early Solar System that were ejected).

The classification suggested by the Deep Ecliptic Survey team introduces a formal distinction between scattered-near objects (which could be scattered by Neptune) and scattered-extended objects (e.g. 90377 Sedna) using a Tisserand's parameter value of 3.

The Planet Nine hypothesis suggests that the orbits of several detached objects can be explained by the gravitational influence of a large, unobserved planet between 200 AU and 1200 AU from the Sun and/or the influence of Neptune.

Classification 

Detached objects are one of five distinct dynamical classes of TNO; the other four classes are classical Kuiper-belt objects, resonant objects, scattered-disc objects (SDO), and sednoids. Detached objects generally have a perihelion distance greater than 40 AU, deterring strong interactions with Neptune, which has an approximately circular orbit about 30 AU from the Sun. However, there are no clear boundaries between the scattered and detached regions, since both can coexist as TNOs in an intermediate region with perihelion distance between 37 and 40 AU.

Although Sedna is officially considered a scattered-disc object by the MPC, its discoverer Michael E. Brown has suggested that because its perihelion distance of 76 AU is too distant to be affected by the gravitational attraction of the outer planets it should be considered an inner-Oort-cloud object rather than a member of the scattered disc. This classification of Sedna as a detached object is accepted in recent publications.

This line of thinking suggests that the lack of a significant gravitational interaction with the outer planets creates an extended–outer group starting somewhere between Sedna (perihelion 76 AU) and more conventional SDOs like  (perihelion 35 AU), which is listed as a scattered–near object by the Deep Ecliptic Survey.

Influence of Neptune 
One of the problems with defining this extended category is that weak resonances may exist and would be difficult to prove due to chaotic planetary perturbations and the current lack of knowledge of the orbits of these distant objects. They have orbital periods of more than 300 years and most have only been observed over a short observation arc of a couple years. Due to their great distance and slow movement against background stars, it may be decades before most of these distant orbits are determined well enough to confidently confirm or rule out a resonance. Further improvement in the orbit and potential resonance of these objects will help to understand the migration of the giant planets and the formation of the Solar System. For example, simulations by Emel'yanenko and Kiseleva in 2007 show that many distant objects could be in resonance with Neptune. They show a 10% likelihood that 2000 CR105 is in a 20:1 resonance, a 38% likelihood that 2003 QK91 is in a 10:3 resonance, and an 84% likelihood that  is in an 8:3 resonance. The likely dwarf planet  appears to have less than a 1% likelihood of being in a 4:1 resonance.

Influence of hypothetical planet(s) beyond Neptune 
Mike Brown—who made the Planet Nine hypothesis—makes an observation that "all of the known distant objects which are pulled even a little bit away from the Kuiper seem to be clustered under the influence of this hypothetical planet (specifically, objects with semimajor axis > 100 AU and perihelion > 42 AU)."
Carlos de la Fuente Marcos and Ralph de la Fuente Marcos have calculated that some of the statistically significant commensurabilities are compatible with the Planet Nine hypothesis; in particular, a number of objects which are called Extreme trans Neptunian objects (ETNOs)
may be trapped in the 5:3 and 3:1 mean-motion resonances with a putative Planet Nine with a semimajor axis ~700 AU.

Possible detached objects 

This is a list of known objects by decreasing perihelion, that could not be easily scattered by Neptune's current orbit and therefore are likely to be detached objects, but that lie inside the perihelion gap of ≈50–75 AU that defines the sednoids:

Objects listed below have a perihelion of more than 40 AU, and a semimajor axis of more than 47.7 AU (the 1:2 resonance with Neptune, and the approximate outer limit of the Kuiper Belt)

The following objects can also be generally thought to be detached objects, although with slightly lower perihelion distances of 38-40 AU.

See also 
 Classical Kuiper belt object
 List of Solar System objects by greatest aphelion
 List of trans-Neptunian objects
 Extreme trans-Neptunian object
 Planets beyond Neptune

Notes

References 
 

 
Oort cloud